Jim Baxter (8 October 1887 – 22 April 1952) was an Australian rules footballer who played with Collingwood in the Victorian Football League (VFL).

Notes

External links 

Jim Baxter's profile at Collingwood Forever

1887 births
1952 deaths
Australian military personnel of World War I
Australian rules footballers from Victoria (Australia)
Collingwood Football Club players
Footscray Football Club (VFA) players